Uddanam is a region in the Indian state of Andhra Pradesh. It is spread over a some portions of the districts of Srikakulam district and covering mandals of Ichchapuram, Kanchili, Kaviti, Sompeta and Vajrapu Kotturu. The Government of India set up a dialysis center in the region.

References 

Sub regions of Andhra Pradesh
Coastal Andhra
Geography of Srikakulam district